Sigma Aquilae, Latinized from σ Aquilae, is the Bayer designation for a binary star system in the equatorial constellation of Aquila. The baseline apparent magnitude of the pair is +5.17, which, according to the Bortle Dark-Sky Scale, is bright enough to be seen with the naked eye from suburban skies.

Sigma Aquilae is a double-lined spectroscopic binary system consisting of two massive B-type main sequence stars; each has a stellar classification of B3 V. They are detached components, which means the two stars are sufficiently distant from each other that neither fills its Roche lobe.

Because the orbital plane lies close to the line of sight with the Earth, they form an eclipsing binary system. The two components are each distorted by the gravity of the other star, and their shapes mean that the magnitude of the star system varies constantly even outside of the eclipses, an arrangement known as a Beta Lyrae variable.  The brightness of the pair decreases during each eclipse, which occurs with a frequency determined by their orbital period of 1.95026 days. During the eclipse of the primary component the net magnitude decreases by 0.20 to 5.37; the eclipse of the secondary component results in a magnitude decrease of 0.10 to 5.27.

References

External links
 Image ADS 12737
 HR 7474
 CCDM 19392+0524

Aquila (constellation)
Beta Lyrae variables
185507
Aquilae, Sigma
B-type main-sequence stars
Eclipsing binaries
Spectroscopic binaries
096665
Aquilae, 44
7474
BD+05 4225